The City airport is an umbrella term used to refer to airports - international, regional or otherwise - that are extremely close - generally walking distance - to the city centre. This discounts any airport that has "city" in the name, like Kansas City Airport, however an airport like Lennart Meri International Airport is a prime example of a city airport.

 Argentina
 Aeroparque Jorge Newbery

 Brasil
 Rio de Janeiro-Santos Dumont Airport

Canada
Billy Bishop Toronto City Airport

Estonia
Lennart Meri Tallinn Airport

Germany
Mannheim City Airport

Japan
Itami Airport

Korea
Gimpo International Airport

Moldova
Bălți City Airport

South Africa
 Wonderboom Airport

Sweden
Göteborg City Airport
Linköping City Airport

Taiwan
 Songshan Airport

United Kingdom
City Airport & Heliport, Barton-upon-Irwell, Greater Manchester
George Best Belfast City Airport
London City Airport
Plymouth City Airport (closed)
Sheffield City Airport (closed)

United States 
Detroit City Airport (now known as Coleman Young Airport)
Washington Reagan National Airport

Zambia
Lusaka City Airport